The Vanished Murderer is a 2015 period suspense crime action thriller film directed by Law Chi-leung and the sequel to 2012's The Bullet Vanishes. A China-Hong Kong co-production, the film was released in China on November 27, 2015.

Plot
At a women's prison in the Northern China in 1932, Prisoner Fu Yuan (Jiang Yiyan) digs a tunnel in her prison cell with a silver spoon and escapes. Inspector Song Donglu (Lau Ching-wan) is summoned to investigate Fu's escape, a case that is personal to Song as Fu was not only arrested by him but had also become his friend and confidant ever since being jailed, her advice helping him solve a seemingly paranormal serial killing case not long ago. By tracking down the letters sent to him by Fu, it sets Song off to Hong City to unravel the truth behind Fu's disappearance. At Hong City, Song found out from a police men that a village has been massacred by a private army owned by Gao Ming Xiong as the villagers are not willing to give their cotton due to low pay for the cotton. Fu uses the massacre to influence people that the private army will rob their money, and wanted the people to kill themselves to protest against the private army and draw attention from the people of the city.

Cast
Sean Lau
Gordon Lam
Li Xiaolu
Jiang Yiyan
Guo Xiaodong
Rhydian Vaughan
Alien Sun

Reception
The film grossed  on its opening weekend at the Chinese box office.

References

External links

2015 action thriller films
2015 crime thriller films
2010s Cantonese-language films
Chinese suspense films
Chinese crime thriller films
Films directed by Law Chi-leung
Hong Kong crime thriller films
Le Vision Pictures films
2010s Mandarin-language films
2010s Hong Kong films